Kohleh-ye Hammam (also Romanized as Kohleh-ye Ḩammām; also known as Koleh-ye Ḩammām) is a village in Sadat Mahmudi Rural District, Pataveh District, Dana County, Kohgiluyeh and Boyer-Ahmad Province, Iran. At the 2006 census, its population was 64, in 11 families.

References 

Populated places in Dana County